Ridha Al-Rouatbi (born 7 February 1938) is a Tunisian former footballer who played as a defender for Étoile du Sahel. He also played for the Tunisian national team, and was selected to play for the team in the 1960 Summer Olympics.

References

External links
 

1938 births
People from Sousse
Living people
Tunisian footballers
Tunisia international footballers
Olympic footballers of Tunisia
Footballers at the 1960 Summer Olympics
1962 African Cup of Nations players
Étoile Sportive du Sahel players
Association football defenders